Muleskinner was an American bluegrass supergroup, active during the early 1970s.

Early history
In the late 1960s, Peter Rowan and David Grisman played together in a psychedelic band Earth Opera. The band didn't last longer than couple of years and Rowan went on to join Seatrain, where he met Richard Greene. After two albums with Seatrain, Greene and Rowan went on to form Muleskinner with banjoist Bill Keith, whom Greene had played with in Jim Kweskin and the Jug Band in the early 1960s, and Clarence White, former guitarist of Kentucky Colonels and The Byrds, along with bassist John Kahn and drummer John Guerin, who also worked for The Byrds.

Planned show with Bill Monroe
This lineup can be considered as a bluegrass supergroup, a term not often used with bluegrass. The original start of the group was connected with Bill Monroe, as Richard Greene (who played for his Bluegrass Boys before), was asked  to put a band together to join him in a television program. However, Monroe's bus had some technical problems and Muleskinner had to play the whole evening on their own and it was a success.

Recording contract
All this resulted in a recording contract with Warner Bros. and the band recorded its first studio album, Muleskinner, which included elements from jazz, country and progressive bluegrass. This recording can be noted as the first one in the bluegrass genre to include drums.

Clarence White death
The album was successful, but the band ended under tragic circumstances: guitarist Clarence White was killed by a drunken driver just couple of months after the record was released.
The band also recorded a live album in 1973, which was released 25 years later.

Discography
 Muleskinner (1973) (re-released as A Potpourri of Bluegrass Jam in 1994)
 Muleskinner Live: Original Television Soundtrack (1998, recorded 1973)

Members
 David Grisman - mandolin
 Peter Rowan - guitar, vocals
 Clarence White - guitar, vocals
 Richard Greene - violin, vocals
 Bill Keith - banjo
 John Kahn - bass
 Stuart Schulman - bass
 John Guerin - drums

References

External links
 Muleskinner on YouTube
New Camptown Races, Dark Hollow

American bluegrass music groups
1973 disestablishments in California
Musical groups disestablished in 1973
Progressive bluegrass music groups